Aurelio Faustino Monteagudo Cintra (November 19, 1943 – November 10, 1990), nicknamed "Monty", was a right-handed screwball pitcher who played in Major League Baseball. He was the son of former big-leaguer René Monteagudo.

Career
Monteagudo was born in Caibarién, Villa Clara Province, Cuba. He moved to Venezuela after Fidel Castro's rise to power in his homeland.

As a 19-year-old rookie, Monteagudo made his majors debut with the Kansas City Athletics on September 1, 1963. After three-plus seasons with Kansas City, he was dealt to the Houston Astros on May 17, 1966. At the end of the season, he received Venezuelan citizenship. Then, he joined the Chicago White Sox on July 16, 1967, with a new nationality. After a season in Chicago, he played with the Kansas City Royals (1970) and California Angels (1973).

Monteagudo was traded along with Chris Coletta from the Angels to the Phillies for Denny Doyle at the Winter Meetings on December 6, 1973, completing a transaction from four months earlier on August 14 when Philadelphia purchased Billy Grabarkewitz's contract from California.

In seven seasons, Monteagudo compiled a 3–7 record with 58 strikeouts, a 5.05 ERA, four saves, and 132 innings pitched in 72 games (65 as a reliever). He played his final majors game on September 28, 1973.

Monteagudo also played 20 seasons in the Venezuelan Professional Baseball League with five teams: Caracas (1963–68), Magallanes (1968), La Guaira (1968–74, 1976–82) and Portuguesa (1975), compiling a 79–81 record with 897 strikeouts and a 3.37 ERA. On December 20, 1973, Monteagudo kept the Cardenales de Lara hitless for  innings until Faustino Zabala ruined the no-hitter with a single to center field.

At the same time, Monteagudo played in the Mexican League with the Puebla, Coahuila, Aguascalientes and Veracruz clubs. He pitched a no-hitter game against Nuevo Laredo (March 19, 1979) and led the league in strikeouts once (222, in 1978). After retiring in 1981, he started a successful managerial career in the league.

Aurelio Monteagudo was killed in a car accident in Saltillo, Mexico nine days before his 47th birthday. He, Aurelio Rodríguez and Aurelio López are the only three players in MLB history named Aurelio, and all three were killed in car accidents between the ages of 44 and 52.

See also
 List of Major League Baseball players from Cuba
 List of second-generation Major League Baseball players

References

External links
, or Retrosheet
Mexican League statistics
Venezuelan Professional Baseball League statistics

1943 births
1990 deaths
Acereros de Monclova players
Albuquerque Dukes players
Angeles de Puebla players
Asheville Tourists players
Binghamton Triplets players
California Angels players
Caribbean Series managers
Chicago White Sox players
Dallas Rangers players
Edmonton Trappers players
Hawaii Islanders players
Houston Astros players
Indianapolis Indians players
Kansas City Athletics players
Kansas City Royals players
Leones del Caracas players
Lewiston Broncs players
Llaneros de Portuguesa players
Major League Baseball pitchers
Major League Baseball players from Cuba
Cuban expatriate baseball players in the United States
Mexican baseball players
Mineros de Coahuila players
Navegantes del Magallanes players
Cuban expatriate baseball players in Venezuela
Oklahoma City 89ers players
Omaha Royals players
Osos Negros de Toluca players
People from Caibarién
Pericos de Puebla players
Portland Beavers players
Rieleros de Aguascalientes players
Road incident deaths in Mexico
Rojos del Águila de Veracruz players
Salt Lake City Angels players
Tecolotes de Nuevo Laredo players
Tiburones de La Guaira players
Tulsa Oilers (baseball) players
Vancouver Mounties players
Cuban expatriate baseball players in Mexico